Truth of Lieutenant Klimov is a 1981 Soviet drama film directed by Oleg Dashkevich.

Plot 
The film tells about a naval officer Klimov, who finds out that his wife cheated on him. He publicly hit his opponent, as a result of which he was demoted and transferred to the Northern Fleet, where he will begin to restore his reputation.

Cast 
 Andrei Rostotsky as Lt. Pavel Sergeevich Klimov
 Yuri Kamornyy as Capt. Stepanov
 Pavel Ivanov as Capt. Zabelin
 Petr Shelokhonov as Nikolai Maksimovich Chervonenko (as Peter Shelokhonov)
 Igor Dobryakov
 Elena Kondulaynen as Lucia
 Valeri Doronin
 Andrei Rakhmanov
 Aleksandr Lipov
 Ivan I. Krasko as Staff Officer
 Boris Khimichev as Admiral

References

External links 
 

1981 films
1980s Russian-language films
Soviet drama films
1981 drama films